Enzo Williams is a Filipino filmmaker.

Early life
Williams decided at nine to become a filmmaker.

Career
Williams won best film at Los Angeles City College film school in 2012. He returned to Manila in 2014 and directed his first feature film, Bonifacio: Ang Unang Pangulo. It became one of the most awarded films in Filipino cinema. It earned 22 awards, including three for best picture, along with two best director awards: from Star Awards, as well as from the Filipino Academy of Movie Arts and Sciences Awards (FAMAS) - the country's leading award-giving body.

During the 2016 elections, Williams directed the controversial "Last Christmas” ad for Rodrigo Duterte. He directed senatorial ads for Imee Marcos and Juan Miguel Zubiri. He directed a worldwide promotional ad for the boxer Manny Pacquiao for one of his championship fights. He then directed blockbuster The Escort. His military action film A.W.O.L. was made in partnership with the Armed Forces of the Philippines.

Williams' first TV series, Ang Probinsyano earned record-breaking television ratings to become both the longest running and most successful primetime series in the country’s history.

The City Government of San Juan - his hometown - honored Williams with the Excellence Award, given for outstanding contribution in a professional field.

He is currently in pre-production on his next film, Enzo, which is about international race car champion Enzo Pastor.

Filmography

Film

Television

References

Sources
 FULL LIST: Nominees, FAMAS Awards 2015
 FULL LIST: Winners, Star Awards for movies 2015
 FULL LIST: Winners, MMFF 2014 awards night
 Teachers Groups Say Bonifacio Movie Real History

External links
 

Los Angeles City College alumni
Filipino television directors
Filipino film directors
Living people
Year of birth missing (living people)